The International Sustainability Alliance (ISA) is a global network of corporate occupiers, property investors, developers and owners of commercial buildings, who share best practice in the sustainable management of their property portfolios. ISA is dedicated to achieving a more sustainable built environment through the better measurement, benchmarking and understanding of building performance.

Purpose
With 40% of carbon emissions coming from the built environment, real estate owners, occupiers, developers and funders around the world are facing ever increasing demands concerning the need for greater sustainability in the use of existing buildings.

ISA is a response to the growing legislative and economic pressure across the world to address building sustainability. It helps members to develop a common understanding of how their buildings perform, what measures can be taken to improve them and what this means in terms of value and return on their investment.

ISA has a database of commercial building assets comprising information gathered from members with retail, office and other commercial buildings in more than 50 countries. The diversity and breadth of data acquired from members – and in turn available to them – provides a unique resource on which to base decisions on investing in their buildings.

A key purpose of ISA is the provision of robust benchmarking services based on a very extensive and detailed body of data. ISA also promotes research on sustainability in the built environment.

Activities
Production of an Annual Report for each Founding and General Member, containing an assessment of the property data placed in the ISA database by members, which can help them to reduce  emissions, preserve water resources and make well informed  investment decisions.

KPI Benchmarking – the Annual Report contains an analysis of current ISA key performance indicators (KPIs), which include energy, waste and water – at site, building and asset level – by country and sector. This enables members to benchmark their property portfolio within their organisation and against other companies that have provided data.

Reporting – the KPIs are aligned to the Global Reporting Index Commercial Real Estate Sustainability Supplement (GRI CRESS) and the European Public Real Estate Association (EPRA) standards. This enables ISA members to incorporate their results into both their Annual Reports and Corporate Social Responsibility reports in a standardised way.

Certification – ISA provides a gateway for access to certification of the environmental performance of buildings in use through schemes such as BREEAM In-Use.

Research – ISA promotes scientifically based research into sustainability in the built environment for the benefit of members and the wider community.

Organisation
ISA is hosted  by BRE Global Limited. The day-to-day running of the organisation is coordinated by BRE with Task Teams, drawn from the Membership, established to carry out specific activities as and when required.

Current members include some of the largest corporations, developers, property owners and investors with worldwide interests. There is a range of membership categories designed to suit the varying requirements of ISA members. Membership details are available online.

An organisation wishing to apply for ISA membership can contact the ISA team using the contact details given. For further information on the organisation, visit the website.

Current membership
A list of current members is available online.

References

External links
Official website

International sustainability organizations